The Dvorovoi is a Slavic spirit of the courtyard. It was associated with a farmstead's grounds, cattle shed, and stable. The dvorovoi is similar to the house spirit domovoi, though it is less benevolent. A dvorovoi is considered more dangerous than a domovoi as it could pose a threat to livestock, particularly animals with white fur.

References

Bibliography
 Apollon Korinfsky Михайлов день // Народная Русь : Круглый год сказаний, поверий, обычаев и пословиц русского народа. — М.: Издание книгопродавца М. В. Клюкина, 1901. — С. 468–474. 
 Sergey Maximov Домовой-дворовой // Нечистая, неведомая и крестная сила. — СПб.: Товарищество Р. Голике и А. Вильворг, 1903. — С. 44–48. 
 

Slavic tutelary deities